Kagan is a surname (Kaganovich variation). "Kagan" is a primarily Russian-Jewish surname which could be derived from the surname Cohen (in Russian the consonant h is replaced with the consonant g).

Notable people with the Kagan surname include:

 Bernhard Kagan (1866–1932), German chess player, writer, publisher, editor, and organizer
 Carolyn Kagan, British psychologist
 Daryn Kagan (born 1963), former American newscaster
 Donald Kagan (1932–2021), Yale historian specializing in ancient Greece (Frederick and Robert Kagan's father)
 Elena Kagan (born 1960), Associate Justice of the U.S. Supreme Court, dean of Harvard Law School, and U.S. Solicitor General (under President Obama).
 Emily Kagan (born 1981), American mixed martial artist 
 Frederick Kagan (born 1970), professor of military history (Robert Kagan's brother)
 Henri Kagan, French chemist
 Helena Kagan (1889-1978), pioneer-pediatrician of Israel 
 Janet Kagan (1946–2008), author
 Jeremy Kagan (born 1945), American television director
 Jerome Kagan (1929–2021), children developmental psychology
 Joseph Kagan, Baron Kagan (1915–1995), British industrialist
 Kimberly Kagan (born 1972), military historian (Frederick Kagan's wife)
 Lazar Kaganovich (1893-1991), Soviet politician and administrator
 Mimi Kagan (1918–1999), Russian-born American modern dancer, choreographer
 Oleg Kagan (1946–1990), Russian violinist
 Robert Kagan (born 1958), American historian and political commentator (Frederick Kagan's brother)
 Shelly Kagan, philosopher and ethicist at Yale University
 Shimon Kagan (born 1942), Israeli chess master
 Veniamin Kagan (1869–1953), Russian mathematician
 Vladimir Kagan (1927–2016), German furniture designer
 Yisrael Meir Kagan (1838–1933), Polish-born rabbi, halakhist, and ethicist

Kohenitic surnames
Russian-Jewish surnames